Kwon Hwa-woon is a South Korean actor and model. He is known for his roles in Lie After Lie, Sky Castle, Doctor John, Zombie Detective and Mouse. He also appeared in movie Northern Limit Line as Corporal Kim Seung-hyun.

Filmography

Film

Television

Theater

Awards and nominations

References

External links
 
 

1989 births
Living people
21st-century South Korean male actors
South Korean male models
South Korean male television actors
South Korean male film actors
Male actors from Busan